McKinley High School may refer to:

United States
 President William McKinley High School, Honolulu, Hawaii
 McKinley High School (Chicago), Illinois, closed 1954
 McKinley High School (Sebring, Ohio), Sebring, Ohio
 McKinley High School (Louisiana), Baton Rouge, Louisiana
 McKinley Vocational High School, Buffalo, New York
 Canton McKinley High School, Canton, Ohio
 Niles McKinley High School, Niles, Ohio
 McKinley Classical Leadership Academy, St. Louis, Missouri
 McKinley Technology High School, Washington, D.C.

Fictional schools
 William McKinley High School, in the TV shows
The Wonder Years (1988-1993)
Freaks and Geeks (1999-2001)
Glee (2009-2015)
 William McKinley High School; in the movies 
Accepted
Final Destination 3 (2006)
Bad Moms (2016)
 McKinley High School, in the Canadian television series Edgemont (2001-2005)
 McKinley High School, in This Is Us Season 2, Episode 8

See also 
 McKinley School (disambiguation)